The Murray (or just Murray) was an electoral district of the Legislative Assembly in the Australian colony of Victoria from 1856 to 1877.

It was based in north-eastern Victoria, south of the Murray River. Its area was defined in the Victorian Constitution Act of 1855 as: "Bounded on the South and West by the Counties of Evelyn and Anglesea and the River Goulburn to its Junction with the River Murray; on the North and North-east by the River Murray; and on the East by the great dividing Range, excepting the Country comprised in the Electoral Districts of the Murray Boroughs and of Beechworth" (Ovens).

History 
The Murray Boroughs was a separate electorate and consisted of the towns of Wodonga, Wangaratta, Benalla, Euroa, Avenal and Seymour.

The district of The Murray was one of the initial districts of the first Victorian Legislative Assembly, 1856.

1861 election controversy 
In August 1861 the electorate was declared for David Reid with 393 votes, a majority of ten, over John Orr. Mr Curtis A. Reid, the returning electoral officer for The Murray and brother of David Reid disallowed the entirety of the Longwood votes as they were made in pencil not pen and ink. John Orr brought a petition against the return of David Reid and in May 1862 the Elections and Qualification Committee declared the votes legal and disqualified David Reid as member for The Murray.

Members for The Murray
Initially, two members represented the electorate, then only one following the redistribution of 1859.

 = by-election

Nicholson went on to represent the then newly created Electoral district of Sandridge from October 1859.

References

Former electoral districts of Victoria (Australia)
1856 establishments in Australia
1877 disestablishments in Australia